The Relationship is the debut, self-titled album by the American alternative rock band The Relationship, released on November 30, 2010 through Golden State Records. The album was recorded in the home studio of lead singer and guitarist Brian Bell, who is also a guitarist for the acclaimed rock band Weezer.

Background
News regarding a side project by Weezer guitarist Brian Bell began circulating in 2007 on the official Weezer message board. Since this time, many demos and adjusted versions of songs have been posted on the band's Myspace and Facebook pages. In 2008, the band opened for Weezer during several dates of their Troublemaker Tour. In Fall 2010, The album was announced as completed and given a release date of November 30, 2010.

Track listing

Personnel

Brian Bell – vocals, guitar
Nate Shaw – guitar
Eric J. Dubowsky – keyboards, vocals
Jason Hiller - bass
Blair Sinta - drums

Additional musicians
Jamie Reidling – drums (tracks 1, 2 and 5)
Ben Peeler – lap steel, guitar (tracks 4, 6, 8, 9 and 10)
Deron Johnson - keyboards (track 3)
Abe Dirther - guitar (tracks 3 and 7)
Elmo Peeler - piano (track 11)
Jack Riedling - piano (track 5)

References

External links
 The Relationship Official Website

2010 debut albums